Médée is a 2001 French drama film directed by Don Kent and starring Isabelle Huppert. It is based upon the play, Medea, by Euripides.

Cast
 Isabelle Huppert as Médée
 Pierre Barrat as Créon
 Jean-Quentin Châtelain as Jason
 Jean-Philippe Puymartin as Egée
 Emmanuelle Riva as The chorus
 Anne Benoît as The nanny
 Michel Peyrelon as The pedagogue
 Pascal Tokatlian as The servant

See also
 Isabelle Huppert on screen and stage

References

External links

2001 drama films
2001 television films
2001 films
Films based on Medea (Euripides play)
French television films
2000s French-language films
2000s French films